2122 Pyatiletka, provisional designation , is a stony asteroid from the inner regions of the asteroid belt, approximately 11 kilometers in diameter.

The asteroid was discovered on 14 December 1971, by Soviet astronomer Tamara Smirnova at the Crimean Astrophysical Observatory in Nauchnyj, on the Crimean peninsula. It was named for "pyatiletka", the first Five-Year Plan of the USSR.

Orbit and classification 

Pyatiletka orbits the Sun in the inner main-belt at a distance of 2.3–2.5 AU once every 3 years and 9 months (1,360 days). Its orbit has an eccentricity of 0.03 and an inclination of 8° with respect to the ecliptic.

Physical characteristics 

Pyatiletka has been characterized as a stony S-type asteroid.

Lightcurves 

A fragmentary rotational lightcurve of Pyatiletka was obtained from photometric observations at the Palomar Transient Factory in California in February 2010. Lightcurve analysis gave a tentative rotation period of 8.899 hours with a brightness variation of 0.10 magnitude. As of 2017, no other lightcurve has been published.

Diameter and albedo 

According to the surveys carried out by the Japanese Akari satellite and NASA's Wide-field Infrared Survey Explorer with its subsequent NEOWISE mission, Pyatiletka measures between 11.00 and 11.55 kilometers in diameter, and its surface has an albedo between 0.1931 and 0.224. The Collaborative Asteroid Lightcurve Link assumes a standard albedo for stony asteroids of 0.20 and calculates a diameter of 10.75 kilometers with an absolute magnitude of 12.21.

Naming 

This minor planet was named in honor of the five-year plans of the Soviet Union on the occasion of the 50th anniversary of its first adoption. The official naming citation was published by the Minor Planet Center on 1 April 1980.

References

External links 
 Asteroid Lightcurve Database (LCDB), query form (info )
 Dictionary of Minor Planet Names, Google books
 Asteroids and comets rotation curves, CdR – Observatoire de Genève, Raoul Behrend
 Discovery Circumstances: Numbered Minor Planets (1)-(5000) – Minor Planet Center
 
 

002122
Discoveries by Tamara Mikhaylovna Smirnova
Named minor planets
19711214